Jason Palmer (c. 1977 – 16 May 2010), a United States-born former Marine, was the first corrections officer in New Zealand to die on active duty. He was punched by an inmate and fell, hitting his head on the floor, and dying in hospital the next day.

Biography
Born in South Carolina, Palmer attended Jefferson High School in West Virginia and then spent four years in the United States Marine Corps, including time at Quantico Marine Corps base. He met a New Zealand woman, Tracy, online and moved to New Zealand where they married a year later. When he died, he was survived by Tracy and three children: Taylor 15, Riley, 5, and Abbey, 3.

Death
Palmer worked at the Spring Hill Corrections Facility. Palmer was killed by Latu Savelio Halangingie Kepu while unlocking the door to Kepu's cell with two other officers. As the door opened, Kepu swung a punch at Palmer who fell back and hit his head on the concrete pathway outside the cell. Palmer died in hospital the next day when his life support was discontinued. There had been previous confrontations between Kepu and Palmer and Palmer had laid several misconduct charges against Kepu, including one the day before the deadly attack. Palmer had allegedly requested to be moved from that unit in writing due to death threats from Kepu, but his requests were apparently denied. Also not mentioned in the official inquiry is that the 3 officers including Jason Palmer that unlocked Kepu that day were very inexperienced - the most senior officer on the unit that day had been moved down to a low-security unit due to staffing shortages. At the inquest, much was made of the "lack" of high-security process during the unlock; such as why Kepu wasn't made to stand with his hands on the wall as he was unlocked. This focus obscured the real reason why Jason's death occurred in a supposedly low-security prison - managerial incompetence.

Kepu had been reclassified as a maximum security prisoner because he had already seriously assaulted another officer 3 weeks previously, but had not yet been relocated to the maximum security facility at Paremoremo because they did not have any room. He pleaded guilty to manslaughter and was sentenced to six years and four months in prison. He appealed the length of the sentence, but this was declined.

Kepu is a member of the Killer Beez gang and reports arose that claimed the death was a gang-ordered hit, whilst prison staff members were well aware of threats made against Palmer. The Corrections Department denied the claim made by these reports, stating that an internal investigation had found that prison management and staff were not at fault. Palmer's mother, Ada Palmer, disagreed with the findings of the Corrections Department's investigation. It was reported that Ada Palmer said, "They said it was an accident... it is a cover-up."

Judith Collins, then Minister of Corrections, described Palmer's death as the saddest day in the department's history and moved in Parliament "that this House express its deep sympathy and condolences to the wife, family, friends, and colleagues of Spring Hill Corrections Officer Jason Palmer, who died on Sunday as a result of an assault by a prisoner."

References

1970s births
2010 deaths
Military personnel from South Carolina
Prison officers
American manslaughter victims
United States Marines
American emigrants to New Zealand